Betti may refer to:

People
Betti (given name)
Betti (surname)

Other uses
Betti number in topology, named for Enrico Betti
Betti's theorem in engineering theory, named for Enrico Betti
Betti reaction, a chemical addition reaction

See also
Beti (disambiguation)
Betty (disambiguation)